Goodea atripinnis, the blackfin goodea, is a species of killifish from the family Goodeidae. This species was described by David Starr Jordan in 1880 with the type locality given as Leon, Guanajuato in Mexico. This species occurs as a native in  nine Mexican federal states and has been introduced to Durango and to the Distrito Federal. It has the largest distribution range of any species within the family Goodeidae, its range extending from Hidalgo in the east to Nayarit in the west and from Michoacán in the south to Zacatecas in the north.

References

atripinnis
Fish described in 1880